Esperanza, officially the Municipality of Esperanza,  is a 1st class municipality in the province of Agusan del Sur, Philippines. According to the 2020 census, it has a population of 59,353 people.

History 
The municipality of Esperanza was founded on September 11, 1953, per Executive Order No. 611 signed and approved by President Elpidio Quirino. It duly then began its functions as an independent municipality on September 27, 1953, when its first town officials were appointed.

Esperanza was the oldest town in northern Agusan del Sur. It was also the largest town in the province by land area until several municipalities were created out its territories in the late 20th century, namely: Las Nieves, San Luis, Sibagat, and Bayugan which later turned into a city and has far surpassed its mother town in terms of economy and population.

The Golden Tara

In July 1917, a flood and storm swept through Agusan del Sur in Barangay Cubo of Esperanza. After the storm, a Manobo woman named Bilay Ocampo was on the banks of the muddy Wawa River where she eventually found a figure where it washed up from the river. The 21-karat gold figure dating to around 850 to 950 C.E. weighs  and depicts a woman sitting in the lotus position in Buddhism, is ornamented with jewelry on her body, and wears a headdress. This figure turned out to be a representation of the Bodhisattva Tara. Now known as the "Golden Tara", after its discovery, it was handed to the former Deputy Governor Bias Baclagon then it was passed to the Agusan Coconut Company, because of a debt. They then donated the Golden Tara to the Field Museum in Chicago, Illinois, United States where it is currently held in the Grainger Hall of Gems. Dr. H. Otley Beyer, known as the father of Philippine Archaeology and Anthropology, tried to encourage the government to buy the artifact however all attempts failed due to lack of funds.

Another historical claim has it that when Bilay Ocampo found the Golden Tara, she decided to keep it as a doll. However she was told to give it over to Baclagon because they believed it was a diwata. Because of this, it was previously called Buwawan ni Baclagon or Ginto ni Baclagon (both translates to "Gold of Baclagon"). However, according to Bilay's granddaughter, Constancia, the Golden Tara wasn't handed over but it was stolen from her grandmother. The question of the validity of the purchase of the Golden Tara and whether it was acquired legally if it was in fact originally stolen from Bilay remains a debate of history.

The Golden Tara remains exhibited in the Grainger Hall of Chicago Field Museum (now known as the Field Museum of Natural History) up to the present time and reports has it that the Philippine government has plans to continue its negotiations in re-acquiring the figure.

According to UP scholar Dr. Juan Francisco, he described the golden statue as, "One of the most spectacular discoveries in the Philippine archaeological history."

Geography 
According to the Philippine Statistics Authority, the municipality has a land area of  constituting  of the  total area of Agusan del Sur.

Climate

Barangays
Esperanza is politically subdivided into 47 barangays.

Demographics

In the 2020 census, Esperanza had a population of 59,353.

Economy

References

External links

 [ Philippine Standard Geographic Code]

Municipalities of Agusan del Sur
Establishments by Philippine executive order